Marilyn Lima (born September 28, 1995) is a French actress known for her roles in A Mermaid in Paris (2020), Bang Gang (A Modern Love Story) (2015), Skam France (2018–2020) and J'ai menti (2021).

Career
Lima is originally from Bordeaux. Director Eva Husson discovered her Tumblr blog and, after an informal meeting at a café, chose Lima to play the character of George in her film  Bang Gang (A Modern Love Story) (2015). Lima had no formal acting training.

Lima continued her career on television with the TV movie Entre deux mères (2016) (“Between two mums”) and Frank Bellocq's Des jours meilleurs (2017). In 2017, she was chosen to play Manon Demissy in the French adaptation of Skam.

On April 23, 2019, she announced via Instagram that she would be in the music video for DJ Petit Biscuit's song "We Were Young" featuring JP Cooper. On November 5, 2019, she announced via Instagram that she was filming for Julien Leclercq's Sentinelle. It was released on Netflix on March 5, 2021.

Screen Daily reported that Lima had been cast along with Nicolas Duvauchelle in A Mermaid in Paris, Mathias Malzieu's directorial debut based on his novel of the same name. The film secured a theatrical release on March 11, 2020 but was interrupted by the COVID-19 pandemic. When theatres began reopening following the initial stay-at-home order, the film was rereleased on June 22.

On September 28, 2020, FranceTV Pro announced that Lima was cast as Pauline in a mini-series called J'ai menti (“I lied”). Filming began in early September and concluded in December. The program aired on France 2 in August 2021. 

On September 8, 2021, Coulisses TV announced that Lima was cast as Kimmy in a TV film remake of Constance aux enfers (1963), directed by Gaël Morel and starring Miou-Miou as Constance and Salim Kechiouche as Amine, Kimmy's boyfriend. Filming began in September 2021. 

In 2022, Lima joined the team of Frank Bellocq (whom she'd previously worked with for Soda tele-series Des jours meilleurs) for a new tele-series called @venir, starring Kev Adams and Natacha Lindinger. Filming has already begun as of August 2022 and is expected to wrap later this year, while broadcast is planned for early 2023 on TF1.

Personal life
Lima is the youngest of three sisters. In an interview with Constellation magazine, she said that in her free time, she pursues her love of photography, which she has enjoyed since the early 2010s. She owns about 40 cameras, favoring her 35mm Pentax and Nikon models.

At the end of 2017, she started dating Michel Biel, whom she met while filming the series Skam France, and in which Biel played her onscreen boyfriend Charles Munier.

Activism
One of Marilyn Lima's more passionate endeavors is combatting climate change. In her modeling, she chooses to work with brands whose values are in line with hers when it comes to climate change, ethical fashion and fabric sourcing. In January 2020, Marilyn walked the runway for Chaussettes Orphelines, a Parisian-based clothing brand committed to promoting ecological fashion and recycling worn clothes to combat textile pollution. Since 2020, Lima has modeled for Jolie Momes, a French lingerie brand that operates eco-responsibly by limiting their production lines to already-existing and locally-sourced fabric stocks, and using green packaging for all purchases. Lima promotes environmental groups Project Rescue Ocean and YouthForClimate on her Instagram and her website.  and she works alongside Plastic Free Ibiza, IbizaPreservation, and Project Rescue Ocean by running beach clean-up sites in the pays basque region of France and Spain.

Filmography

Film

Television

Music videos

References

External links
 
 Marilyn.Lima on Instagram

French actresses
Actresses from Bordeaux
1995 births
French film actresses
French television actresses
21st-century French actresses
Living people